Benjamin Kirchhoff (born 11 November 1994) is a German footballer who plays as a centre back for TSV Steinbach Haiger.

Career
On 21 November 2014, Benjamin Kirchhoff made his debut for VfB Stuttgart II in the 3. Liga against VfL Osnabrück.

Career statistics

Personal life
He is the brother of Jan Kirchhoff.

References

External links
 DFB.de profile
 
 Benjamin Kirchhoff at Kicker
 

1994 births
Living people
German footballers
Association football defenders
VfB Stuttgart II players
Kickers Offenbach players
TSV Steinbach Haiger players
3. Liga players
Regionalliga players
Footballers from Frankfurt